Charles Fraser (c.1823 – 25 August 1886) was a New Zealand minister, educationalist and journalist. He was born in Aberdeen, Aberdeenshire, Scotland in c.1823.

References

1823 births
1886 deaths
New Zealand educators
Writers from Aberdeen
19th-century New Zealand journalists
Male journalists
Scottish emigrants to New Zealand
19th-century male writers
Clergy from Aberdeen